Coen de Koning (30 March 1879 – 29 July 1954) was a speed skater and cyclist. He started his sports career as a cyclist, but switched to speed skating and became the second Dutch speed skater to win a world title, in 1905. He finished second in 500 m, and won the 1500, 5000 and 10,000 m events. De Koning won the national all-around title in 1903, 1905 and 1912, and set national records in the 500 m and 10,000 m in 1905; these records stood until 1926 and 1929. De Koning also set a world record in one-hour skating, at 32,370 m in 1906, and won the Elfstedentocht in 1912 and 1917.

Family
De Koning came from a speed skating family. His brother Jacobus "Sjaak" Petrus de Koning won the national all-around title in 1914. His son Jacobus Petrus Coenradus de Koning (born 1907) competed at the 1942 national championships, and his cousin Aad de Koning took part in the 1948 Winter Olympics. His more distant relatives on the brother's side, Truus Dijkstra and Jacques de Koning were also prominent Dutch speed skaters.

References 

1879 births
1954 deaths
People from Edam-Volendam
Dutch male speed skaters
World Allround Speed Skating Championships medalists
Sportspeople from North Holland